Uncle Silas (US: The Inheritance) is a 1947 British drama film directed by Charles Frank and starring Jean Simmons, Katina Paxinou and Derrick De Marney. It is an adaptation of J. Sheridan Le Fanu's 1864 novel Uncle Silas in which an heiress is pursued by her uncle, who craves her money following her father's death.

The film was shot at Denham Studios with sets by the art director Ralph Brinton. The costumes were designed by Elizabeth Haffenden.

Plot
Caroline Ruthyn is the teenage niece of her elderly uncle Silas, a sickly and at one time unbalanced rake who becomes her guardian on the death of her father. The fact that Silas is broke and greedy and young Caroline is the heir to her father's vast fortune is reason enough for Caroline to be wary, but her fears increase when she meets Silas's brutal son, her cousin, and when she discovers that her fearsome former governess, Madame de la Rougierre, is working with her uncle...

Cast
 Jean Simmons as Caroline Ruthyn
 Katina Paxinou as Madame de la Rougierre
 Derrick De Marney as Uncle Silas
 Derek Bond as Lord Richard Ilbury
 Sophie Stewart as Lady Monica Waring
 Esmond Knight as Doctor Bryerly
 Reginald Tate as Austin Ruthyn
 Manning Whiley as Dudley Ruthyn
 Marjorie Rhodes as Mrs Rusk
 John Laurie as Giles
 Frederick Burtwell as Branston
 George Curzon as Sleigh
 O. B. Clarence as Victor Clay
 Frederick Ranalow as Rigg
 Patricia Glyn as Mary Quince
 Robin Netscher as Tom Hawkes

References

External links

1947 films
Films based on works by Sheridan Le Fanu
Films based on Irish novels
Films set in England
Films set in the 19th century
British historical drama films
1940s historical drama films
Films shot at Denham Film Studios
British black-and-white films
1940s English-language films
1940s British films